The Phrygian helmet, also known as the Thracian helmet, was a type of helmet that originated  in ancient Greece and was widely used in Thrace, Dacia, Magna Graecia and the Hellenistic world until well into the Roman Empire.

Characteristics
The names given to this type of helmet are derived from its shape, in particular the high and forward inclined apex, in which it resembles the caps (usually of leather) habitually worn by Phrygian and Thracian peoples. Like other types of Greek helmet, the vast majority of Phrygian helmets were made of bronze. The skull of the helmet was usually raised from a single sheet of bronze, though the forward-pointing apex was sometimes made separately and riveted to the skull. The skull was often drawn out into a peak at the front, this shaded the wearer's eyes and offered protection to the upper part of the face from downward blows. The face was further protected by large cheekpieces, made separately from the skullpiece. Sometimes these cheekpieces were so large that they met in the centre leaving a gap for the nose and eyes. When constructed in this manner they would have embossed and engraved decoration to mimic a beard and moustache.

Use
The Phrygian helmet was worn by Macedonian cavalry in King Philip's day, but his son, Alexander, is said to have preferred the open-faced Boeotian helmet for his cavalry, as recommended by Xenophon. The royal burial in the Vergina Tomb contained a helmet which was a variation on the Phrygian type, exceptionally made of iron, this would support its use by cavalry. The Phrygian helmet is prominently worn in representations of the infantry of Alexander the Great's army, such on the contemporary Alexander sarcophagus. The Phrygian helmet was in prominent use at the end of Greece's classical era and into the Hellenistic period, replacing the earlier 'Corinthian' type from the 5th century BC.

Gallery

Notes

References

Citations

Sources

Ancient Greek helmets
Phrygia